Penny Sparkle is the eighth studio album by American alternative rock band Blonde Redhead. The album was released by 4AD on September 13, 2010 internationally, and on the following day in the United States.

Track listing

Personnel
Credits are adapted from the album's liner notes.

Blonde Redhead
 Kazu Makino
 Amedeo Pace
 Simone Pace

Additional musicians
 Davíð Þór Jónsson – keyboards on "Penny Sparkle"
 Walter Sear – modular Moog synthesizer

Production

 Blonde Redhead – production
 Drew Brown – additional engineering and production
 Chris Coady – additional engineering
 Kabir Hermon – engineering (assistant)
 Alan Moulder – mixing, additional production
 Geoff Pesche – mastering
 David Schoenwetter – engineering (assistant)
 Brian Thorn – engineering (assistant)
 Van Rivers & the Subliminal Kid – production, engineering

Design
 Kazu Makino – design
 Triboro – design

Charts

References

External links
 
 

2010 albums
Blonde Redhead albums
Albums produced by Alan Moulder
4AD albums